Alfonso Quesada Ramírez (born March 15, 1988) is a Costa Rican goalkeeper who currently plays for AD Rosario.

Club career
Quesada came through the Alajuelense youth system and had a season at Spanish Third division side Barbate CF.

Quesada made his Costa Rican league debut for Universidad on 5 August 2007 against Carmelita. He joined Alajuelense in summer 2009.

At the end of December 2019 it was confirmed, that Quesada would join AD Rosario on 1 January 2020.

International career
Quesada has played for Costa Rica at the 2005 FIFA U-17 World Championship and 2007 FIFA U-20 World Cup.

References

External links

1988 births
Living people
People from San Carlos (canton)
Association football goalkeepers
Costa Rican footballers
Costa Rican expatriate footballers
Costa Rica under-20 international footballers
L.D. Alajuelense footballers
C.F. Universidad de Costa Rica footballers
A.D. San Carlos footballers
Municipal Pérez Zeledón footballers
Liga FPD players
Costa Rican expatriate sportspeople in Spain
Expatriate footballers in Spain
Costa Rica youth international footballers